NewVoiceMedia was a cloud service company based in Basingstoke, England. The company's ContactWorld platform uses customer contact technology as a cloud service by connecting customers through existing telephone infrastructures and using the internet to pass along previously collected client information to agents. The company works in 128 countries, with numerous large organisations including: MobileIron, Truphone, Parcelforce,  and the Canadian Cancer Society.

History
Ashley Unitt and Richard Pickering founded NewVoiceMedia in 2000.

In May 2010, NewVoiceMedia received £4 million (US$6.3 million) in a Series A round of funding.

Jonathan Gale was appointed CEO in Feb 2011 and led the company through rapid growth and a series of significant fund raising rounds which fuelled product development and international expansion.

The company received £2.5 million (US$4 million) in August 2011. In 2013, it raised more than £35.2 million (US$55 million) via a £12.8 million (US$20 million) round in January and in September, it raised an additional £22.4 million (US$35 million). By 2014, the company had raised more than £99 million in funding including a £32 million (US$50 million) Series E in July of that year.

In March 2015, Business Insider recognised NewVoiceMedia as one of the 13 enterprise cloud startups with the most venture capitalist funding. In 2015, the London Stock Exchange named NewVoiceMedia as one of the 1,000 Companies to Inspire Britain.

NewVoiceMedia announced it had raised an additional £21 million (US$30 million) in funding in January 2016 from several venture capital funds and Salesforce. The company's total funding has reached over $141.3 million since its inception, making it one of the most successful startup enterprises from the UK backed by Silicon Valley investors. In 2017, NewVoiceMedia was included on Forbes Cloud 100 list and positioned as a 'leader' in Gartner's Magic Quadrant for Contact Centre as a Service, Western Europe.

In January 2018, Dennis Fois was appointed as CEO. NewVoiceMedia was acquired in November 2018 by Vonage Inc for US$350 million.

References

Cloud computing providers
Companies based in Basingstoke